The Grain 128a stream cipher was first purposed at Symmetric Key Encryption Workshop (SKEW) in 2011 as an improvement of the predecessor Grain 128, which added security enhancements and optional message authentication using the Encrypt & MAC approach. One of the important features of the Grain family is that the throughput can be increased at the expense of additional hardware. Grain 128a is designed by Martin Ågren, Martin Hell, Thomas Johansson and Willi Meier.

Description of the cipher 

Grain 128a consists of two large parts: Pre-output function and MAC. The pre-output function has an internal state size of 256 bits, consisting of two registers of size 128 bit: NLFSR and LFSR. The MAC supports variable tag lengths w such that . The cipher uses a 128 bit key.

The cipher supports two modes of operation: with or without authentication, which is configured via the supplied  such that if  then authentication of the message is enabled, and if  authentication of the message is disabled.

Pre-output function 

In addition to the feedback polynomials, the update functions for the NLFSR and the LFSR are:

The pre-output stream is defined as:

Initialisation 

The LFSR is initialised as:

 for 

 for 

The last 0 bit ensures that similar key-IV pairs do not produce shifted versions of each other.

The NLFSR is initialised by copying the entire 128 bit key into the NLFSR:

 for

Start up clocking 

Key stream 

The key stream and MAC functionality in Grain 128a both share the same pre-output stream.

When authentication is enabled, the MAC functionality uses the first  bits (where  is the tag size) after the start up clocking to initialise. The key stream is then assigned every other bit due to the shared pre-output stream.

If authentication is enabled:

If authentication is disabled:

MAC 

Grain 128a supports tags of size  up to 32 bit, to do this 2 registers of size  is used, a shift register() and an accumulator().

Initialisation 

When authentication is enabled Grain 128a uses the first  bits of the pre-output stream() to initialise the shift register and the accumulator. This is done by:

Shift register:

 for 

Accumulator:

 for

Tag generation 

Shift register:

The shift register is fed all the odd bits of the pre-output stream():

Accumulator:

 for

Final tag 

When the cipher has completed the L iterations the final tag() is the content of the accumulator:

 for

References

External links 
 A New Version of Grain-128 with Authentication